Sophie Brandt born Sophie Barth (July 4, 1876 – February 4, 1946) was an American actress and soprano of musical comedy, opera, and waltzes. She was "gifted with a voice capable of attaining unusually high notes," reported one magazine in 1904.  She was known in private life as Mrs. William Burlock. She was born in St. Louis and died at Chicago in 1946.

Early life, marriages

Brandt was born on July 4, 1876, in St. Louis to Felix Barth and Marie Barth (née Brandt). She had one sister called Elizabeth. As years marched on Brandt started dropping years off of her age finally settling on an 1892 year of birth, 16 years off her actual birth year. Some news accounts at the time her death in 1946 state that she was 50 years old or around that age and mentions her husband. 1904 photographs show a mature buxom young woman who if she had been born in 1892 would have made her 12 years old in 1904. The woman in the photographs is clearly older than 12.

Brandt's first marriage was to Ellsworth Ives Chapman in 1900 and her age is given as 23. Chapman was born March 10, 1874, in Connecticut. This marriage does not seem to have produced children. Her second marriage was to William Elliot Burlock in 1921. Burlock was a Chicagoan who was born in the city on August 3, 1879. She settled into a comfortable marriage with Burlock with her background as an opera performer being somewhat forgotten. She died in Chicago February 4, 1946, aged 69.

Performances
The Princess Chic (1904)

References

External links

1904 portrait of Sophie Brandt (University of Washington, Sayre collection)

1876 births
1946 deaths
Singers from Missouri
20th-century American actresses
Actresses from St. Louis
20th-century American singers
Musicians from St. Louis
American sopranos
20th-century American women singers